A quilt is a quilted blanket.

Quilt may also refer to:
 Duvet, bedding consisting of a bag filled with feathers or other material
 Quilting, a sewing technique
 Quilt art, a visual fine art
 Quilt (software), a system for managing patches
"The Quilt" TV Episode Family Matters (TV series) 1989

Books
 The Quilt (Ismat Chughtai story)
The Quilt, children's book by Ann Jonas 1984
The Quilt, young adult novel by Gary Paulsen 2004
The Quilt, novel by T. Davis Bunn 1993

Music
 Quilt (band), a Boston-based psych-folk band
 Quilt (album), a 2011 album by American psychedelic indie rock band Quilt 
 The Quilt, a hip-hop album by Gym Class Heroes

Other 
 QUILTBAG, a generalization of the LGBT acronym.